The Siemens-Halske Sh 5 was a seven-cylinder, air-cooled, radial engine for aircraft built in Germany in the 1920s. First run in 1921, it was rated at 60 kW (80 hp).

Applications
 Albatros L 60
 Dietrich DP.IIa
 Grulich S.1
 Junkers K 16
 Udet U 5

Specifications

See also

References

 bungartz.nl

Aircraft air-cooled radial piston engines
Siemens-Halske aircraft engines
1920s aircraft piston engines